The Bishopric of Havelberg was a Roman Catholic diocese founded by King Otto I of Germany in 946, from 968 a suffragan to the Archbishops of Magedeburg. A Prince-bishopric (Hochstift) from 1151, Havelberg as a result of the Protestant Reformation was secularised and finally annexed by the margraves of Brandenburg in 1598.

Geography
The episcopal seat was in Havelberg near the confluence of the Elbe and Havel rivers. The bishopric roughly covered the western Prignitz region, between the Altmark in the west and the Brandenburgian core territory in the east. While the episcopal territory was supervised by nine Archdeacons (Pröpste), the bishop's—considerably smaller—secular estates were subdivided into four Ämter:
Wittstock
Plattenburg with Wilsnack
Schönhausen with Fischbeck
Fehrbellin

History
King Henry the Fowler in 929 marched against the Polabian Slavs settling east of the Elbe River and defeated them in a battle near Lenzen. Occupying the eastern riverbank, Henry had a fortification built on a hill above the Havel tributary, near its mouth into the Elbe. His son Otto I continued the expeditions and in 936/37 established the Saxon Eastern March (Marca Geronis) on the conquered territories. In 948 he founded the dioceses of Havelberg and Brandenburg, initially suffragans to the Archbishops of Mainz, from 968 to the newly established Archdiocese of Magdeburg. Part of the Northern March from 968, Havelberg diocese was occupied by revolting Lutici tribes in the Great Slav Rising of 983 and merely remained a titular see.

Not until 150 years later, King Lothair III of Germany re-occupied Havelberg in 1130; the eastern Elbe bank was finally reconquered by the Ascanian margrave Albert the Bear in 1136/37. Its first and most famous Prince-Bishop was the Premonstratensian canon Anselm of Havelberg, who had been anointed already in 1129 by the Magedeburg archbishop Norbert of Xanten. Anselm first took his seat at Jerichow in 1144. Upon the Wendish Crusade in 1147, he was able to found a cathedral chapter at Havelberg and to begin the building of Havelberg Cathedral, which was consecrated in 1170.

The diocesan and secular territory were already separated in 1151. However, the bishops held no secular rights in the town of Havelberg itself, which was enfeoffed to the Brandenburg margraves. In 1383 the Holy Blood of Wilsnack became a famous pilgrimage site, while Dietrich Man was bishop. From the 14th century onwards, the Havelberg bishops also used Plattenburg Castle as a summer residence.

After long-lasting quarrels with the mighty Brandenburg prince-electors, the Premonstratensian chapter finally gave in to transform Havelberg into a collegiate church (Stift). From 1514 onwards the deans of the cathedral were appointed by the Margraves of Brandenburg. In the course of the Protestant Reformation, the Bishopric of Havelberg turned Lutheran and from 1554 was administrated by Joachim Frederick of Hohenzollern, son of Elector John George of Brandenburg. The Bishopric was finally secularised and incorporated into Brandenburg in 1571. Its annexation was complete, when Joachim Frederick succeeded his father as Brandenburg elector in 1598.

Bishops

References

Jürgen Schrader: Der Flecken Calvörde – Eine 1200-jährige Geschichte. Göttingen: Verlag Die Werkstatt, 2011, p. 54.

External links
 Bishopric of Havelberg at GCatholic.org
 Bishopric of Havelberg at Catholic Hierarchy

946 establishments
1598 disestablishments in the Holy Roman Empire
Former states and territories of Brandenburg
Roman Catholic dioceses in the Holy Roman Empire
Former Roman Catholic dioceses in Germany
Prince-bishoprics of the Holy Roman Empire in Germany